Hari Joshi (born Khudia in Harda district, Madhya Pradesh, 17 November 1943) is a Hindi writer, satirist, novelist and poet.

He is a noted writer of modern Hindi literature and is known for his sharp satire. On 13 February 2013, he received the prestigious "Vyangya Shree Samman". He is also a recipient of "Vageeshwari Samman" for his book "Vyangya ke Rang" in 1995 and recipient of "Madhya Pradesh Lekhak Sangh Samman" in 2002 and "Sahitya Maneeshi Samman" in 2013.

Early life 

Born in a remote village, Khudia, Hari Joshi grew up with ten siblings in a place lacking basic amenities such as post office, police station, medical clinic etc. In 1949, Hari Joshi moved to Harda to pursue primary education. After completing fifth grade in 1954, he moved to Bhopal for further education and later pursued a career in engineering. He completed his PhD in Refrigeration from Maulana Azad National Institute of Technology (MANIT). He retired as a Professor of Mechanical Engineering from Government Engineering College Ujjain (M.P.) in 2004. He has lived in Bhopal since then

Literary works 

In 1954, he wrote his first poem in Hindi. In 1958, his article "Phool aur Shool" was published in inter-college magazine at Bhopal. His works were later published in leading Hindi national magazines such as "Dharmyug", "Saptahik Hindustan", "Kadambini", "Navneet" and many other reputed magazines. He also contributed to many leading Indian national dailies such as "Navbharat Times", "Dainik Bhaskar", "Nai Dunia". He has authored about 20 books.

Literary works and Government censorship 

In 1982, Dr. Hari Joshi was suspended from Government employment by then Chief Minister of Madhya Pradesh for writing a satirical article Rehearsal Jaree hai" in the section "Aah aur Wah" in leading national daily Dainik Bhaskar on 17 September 1982 . Later writers and journalists came out in support of Dr. Joshi . Leading national dailies such as Times of India, Indian Express, Dharmyug, Dinman, Ravivar, Dainik Bhaskar wrote articles in favour of freedom of speech supporting Dr. Joshi's rights and condemning the unconstitutional step taken by the state Government. On 4 October 1982, then Leader of Opposition of State Assembly Sunderlal Patwa raised this glaring issue in a no confidence motion against the ruling Government. A few months later Hari Joshi was reinstated in Government employment.

In 1997, Housing Board of Madhya Pradesh served a legal notice of defamation for his satirical article "Ishmashan aur Housing Board ka Makaan" published on 17 June 1997 in the section "Kante ki Baat" in the national daily Navbharat Times. The notice was later withdrawn.

Bibliography

References

1943 births
Living people
Hindi-language writers
People from Harda
Writers from Bhopal
Novelists from Madhya Pradesh
Indian satirists